Carl Strommen (born May 7, 1939) is an American composer, music pedagogue and conductor.

Biography 
Strommen first studied English literature at Long Island University in Brookville, New York, where he obtained his  Bachelor of Arts . Subsequently he studied music at the City College of New York (CUNY) in New York, where he obtained his  Master of Music . He completed his studies at the famed Eastman School of Music in Rochester, New York.

Initially he was conductor of the wind orchestras at the  Mamaroneck Public Schools  in Mamaroneck, New York, on the coast of Long Island. He then became professor for orchestration, composition and arrangement at the C.W. Post College  from the Long Island University in Brookville, New York.

He is known in the United States as a leading composer of instrumental and vocal music and especially his pedagogical works play a major role in the training of young musicians. From the 'American Society of Composers, Authors and Publishers' (ASCAP) he was awarded several times for his compositions. He also works as a teacher at workshops and courses for conductors of wind orchestras and is a sought-after guest conductor.

As a composer he mainly writes works for wind orchestras, orchestras, jazz bands and vocal music.

Compositions

Works for orchestra 
  Bluegrass Blowout , for string orchestra
  Festive Dance 
  Go for Baroque , for string orchestra
  Good News Blues , for string orchestra
  Irish Song 
  Stone Mountain Stomp , for string orchestra and piano
  Prairie song , for orchestra

Works for concert band 
 2002  Ramsgate March 
 2005  Elegy 
 2005  Fanfare for a Festival 
 2006  Nalukataq  (guarantee of the  Education through Cultural and Historic Organizations  (ECHO) for the  Barrow High School Band  in Barrow, Alaska)
  Afton Variations 
  Annie Laurie 
  All About the Blues 
  Back to School Blues 
  Ballymore Down 
  Barnum Woods (March) 
  Blues Machine 
  Canterbury Walk 
  Centennial 
  Chelsea Bridge 
  Chorale and Dance 
  Cielo De Oro (Golden Sky) 
  Cloud Splitter 
  Country March 
  Cumberland cross 
  Dawnswood Overture 
  Dedication 
  Devon Point 
  Do not Feed the Drummers 
  Eagle Lake March 
  Edgemont Festival Overture 
  Flight of the Phoenix 
  Flourish for a Celebration 
  French Country Dance 
  Fuego del Alma 
  Gigue Française 
  Glengarry Way 
  Haleakala (House of the Sun) 
  Harlequins Court March 
  Highbridge Way 
  Highlander 
  In Their Honor 
  Into the Wind 
  Invocation and Dance 
  King's Row 
  Los Matadores 
  Mazatlan 
  Mountain Celebrations 
  Pacifica 
  Paths Of Glory 
  Prairie Song 
  Quaere Verum (Seek the Truth) 
  Ravensgate 
  Roscommon Way 
  Scenes from the Peconic 
  Scrimshaw Tales 
  Shivaree 
  Skywalker 
  Sleighing Song 
  Storm Mountain Jubilee 
  Suo Gân 
  The Grand Tetons , overture
  To a Distant Place 
  Tir Na Nog (A Celtic Legend) 
  Tribute 
  Variations On A Sailing Song 
  Schlong Rocket

Works for choirs 
 1982  Coventry Carol , for mixed choir
 1984  Like an Eagle , for mixed choir
 1984  Summer Wind , for mixed choir
 1987  Together we Stand , for mixed choir
 1997  Aura Lee , for mixed choir
 2004  Setting Sail (Freedom of the Spirit) , for mixed choir, wind orchestra and piano - text: Walt Whitman s Leaves of Grass  »(On the occasion of the 50th anniversary of the  CW Post College  of the Long Island University in Brookville (New York))
  A Christmas Promise , for mixed choir, guitar and drums
  A New Tomorrow , for mixed choir
  American Hymn , for mixed choir and piano
  Ash Grove

External links 
 Alfred Biography Carl Fischer Biography Choral article in JSTOR

21st-century American composers
American male conductors (music)
20th-century composers
21st-century composers
American music educators
1939 births
Living people
American male composers
20th-century American conductors (music)
21st-century American conductors (music)
20th-century American male musicians
21st-century American male musicians